Jacek Lech Komuda (born 23 June 1972) is a Polish writer and historian. He specialized in the period of the Polish–Lithuanian Commonwealth and History of Poland (1569–1795), and is the author of several novels and short stories of fantasy/historical novel genre. He is a co-author of the Dzikie Pola role-playing game, and script writer for Earth 2160 computer games. He is also an editor of computer game magazine GameStar (Polish edition), and used to contribute to Click! and Komputer Świat GRY magazines.

Works

Books 
 Dzikie Pola roleplaying game
 Opowieści z Dzikich Pól (short story anthology, Alfa 1999)
 Wilcze gniazdo (novel, Fabryka Słów 2002)
 Opowieści z Dzikich Pól (short story anthology, Fabryka Słów 2004)
 Warchoły i pijanice (history book, Fabryka Słów 2004)
 Imię Bestii (short story anthology, Fabryka Słów 2005)
 Bohun (novel, Fabryka Słów 2006)
 Czarna szabla (short story anthology, Fabryka Słów 2007)
 Diabeł Łańcucki (novel, Fabryka Słów 2007)
 Galeony wojny (novel, Fabryka Słów 2007, t.  1: ,)
 Czarna bandera (short story anthology, Fabryka Słów 2008)
 Herezjarcha (short story anthology, Fabryka Słów 2008)
 Samozwaniec Tom I (novel, Fabryka Słów 2009)

Short stories
Czarna Cytadela ("Nowa Fantastyka" 5/1991)
Zapomniana duma ("Fenix" 2/1995)
Trzech do podziału ("Nowa Fantastyka" 6/1996)
Wampiry z Odrzykońskiej ("Nowa Fantastyka" 12/1999)
Tak daleko od nieba ("Nowa Fantastyka" 6/1997 and anthology Robimy rewolucję, Prószyński i S-ka 2000)
Nobile verbum ("Nowa Fantastyka" 8/2003)
36 pięter w dół (anthology Demony, Fabryka Słów 2004)
Diabeł w kamieniu ("Nowa Fantastyka" 10/2004)

See also 
 Andrzej Pilipiuk

1972 births
Living people
21st-century Polish historians
Polish male non-fiction writers
Polish fantasy writers